Shirab (also Romanized as Shīrāb; also known as Shūr Āb) is a village in Dast Jerdeh Rural District, Chavarzaq District, Tarom County, Zanjan Province, Iran. At the 2006 census, its population was 39, in 10 families.

References 

Populated places in Tarom County